Battlefield 2042 is a 2021 first-person shooter, developed by DICE and published by Electronic Arts. It is the twelfth main installment in the Battlefield series and was released on November 19, 2021, for PlayStation 4, PlayStation 5, Windows, Xbox One, and Xbox Series X/S. Unlike previous games in the series, Battlefield 2042 is solely multiplayer and does not have a single-player campaign. It features support for cross-platform play, a first in the series. Battlefield 2042 received mixed reviews from critics and a negative reception from players for its technical issues, lack of features, and certain changes to the gameplay. The game failed to meet the sales expectations of Electronic Arts.

Gameplay 
Similar to its predecessors, Battlefield 2042 is a multiplayer-focused first-person shooter. As the game is set in the near future, it features futuristic weapons and gadgets like deployable turrets and drones, as well as vehicles that players can control. Players can request a vehicle air-drop to any location. The game introduced a "Plus" system which allows players to customize their weapons on the spot. The class system is significantly overhauled and removes the four defined classes from previous games; instead, players can assume control of a specialist who falls under the four traditional Battlefield gameplay classes of Assault, Engineer, Medic, and Recon. These characters can wield any of the weapons and gadgets that a player has unlocked. Each operator has their own unique skills and gadgets. For instance, one of the specialists, Emma "Sundance" Rosier, is equipped with a wingsuit, while another, Maria Falck, is equipped with a healing pistol. Levolution and destructive environments from Battlefield 4 return in Battlefield 2042, and extreme weather effects such as tornadoes and sandstorms which may affect gameplay. The game featured seven maps at launch, including 'Breakaway', the largest map in the history of the Battlefield franchise.

The game has three main gameplay modes. "All-Out Warfare" encompasses "Breakthrough" and "Conquest", two staple modes of the series. In Conquest, two teams combat against each other to capture control points; once all control points in a sector are captured, the team controls said sector. In Breakthrough, one team must try to capture another team's control points, while another team must defend them. Both modes can be played with and against AI-controlled players. The PlayStation 5, Windows, and Xbox Series X/S versions support matches with up to 128 players, whereas the PlayStation 4 and Xbox One versions support up to 64 players. For the first time in the series, Battlefield 2042 features support for cross-platform play with the PlayStation 5, Windows, and  Xbox Series X/S versions. While the PlayStation 4 and Xbox One versions also support the feature, it is restricted to only players on the two aforementioned platforms.

The second main mode included in the game is a community-driven platform called "Battlefield Portal". Portal allows players to create customized multiplayer modes and features select maps from past Battlefield games such as Battlefield 1942, Battlefield: Bad Company 2, and Battlefield 3. In addition, players can modify core gameplay elements such as health, weapon loadouts, and movement through a web-based scripting application.

The third mode is a cooperative multiplayer mode called "Hazard Zone". In this mode, players are divided into teams, and they must compete with each other to retrieve and extract data drives from the debris of fallen satellites. These data drives are guarded by enemy combatants controlled by AI-controlled players. Players earn "dark market credits" after successfully extracting a data drive. These credits can be spent on purchasing new weapons and upgrades in this mode.

Synopsis

Setting and characters 
Battlefield 2042 does not have a single-player campaign. Instead, the story is told through multiplayer gameplay. Decades of devastation caused by collapsing economies, rising sea levels and broken alliances (including the collapse of the European Union due to Germany's bankruptcy and subsequent refugees known as "No-Pats") come to a peak in 2040 when a Kessler syndrome event occurs, causing 70% of orbiting satellites to crash to Earth. The resulting permanent global blackout causes tensions between the United States and Russia to skyrocket, with war breaking out by the year 2042.

Outside of multiplayer gameplay, the story is also told on Electronic Arts' official website for Battlefield 2042. A standalone short film titled Exodus, which depicts events leading up to the 2042 war and features returning Battlefield 4 character Irish, premiered on August 12, 2021, via Battlefields YouTube channel.

The 10 specialists announced are:

 Webster Mackay, a former Canadian soldier who is agile on his feet and uses a grappling hook to traverse the landscape.
 Maria Falck, a German medic who has a pistol that shoots healing darts and can revive teammates to full health.
 Wikus "Casper" Van Daele, a South African ghillie suit-wearing sniper.
 Pyotr "Boris" Guskovsky,  a Russian combat engineer who can place down sentry guns.
 Kimble "Irish" Graves, a former United States Marine (and recurring character from Battlefield 4) who can defend his teammates with a deployable bulletproof shield or an APS.
 Navin Rao, a skilled Indian hacker who can bring down enemy networks.
 Santiago "Dozer" Espinoza, a tough Mexican soldier who can tank damage.
 Emma "Sundance" Rosier, a French aerial specialist skilled with explosives who uses their wingsuit to fly around.
 Ji-Soo Paik, a South Korean whose abilities allow her to spot enemies with ease.
 Constantin "Angel" Anghel, a Romanian who can revive his teammates with full ammunition quickly and call in loadout drops.

Additional specialists are announced every new seasons, from season 1 onwards. The new specialists include:
Ewelina Lis, a Polish special force soldier who is equipped with a rocket launcher that shoots remote-controlled projectiles. She can also highlight the damaged enemy vehicles on the player's screen with a red overlay. (Season 1: Zero Hour)
Charlie Crawford, a former British MI6 agent who also moonlighted as an arms dealer for the Dark Market organization. He can deploy a stationary minigun, as well as refill his squadmates' gadget ammunition when reviving them. (Season 2: Master of Arms)
Rasheed Zain, an Egyptian security expert who can use an airburst launcher to flush out enemies behind cover while recovering health after defeating an enemy. (Season 3: Escalation)
Camila Blasco, a Spanish reconnaissance agent who specializes in ambush and infiltration with a device that can scramble enemy systems. (Season 4: Eleventh Hour)

Development 
The game is developed by series developer DICE in Sweden, with Ripple Effect Studios, EA Gothenburg, and Criterion Games assisting development. It has the largest development team for a Battlefield game, and Criterion had to put the production of the next Need for Speed game on hold in order to assist DICE. Unlike previous installments in the series, the game does not have a traditional single-player campaign. This allowed DICE to allocate more resources to develop the multiplayer portion, which was considered to be the studio's area of expertise. Instead, the story is told through the specialists, which are named and fully-voiced characters who have their own stories and perspective. The narrative was described as "evolving" as new operators and locations would be added to the game post-release. While the narrative of the game depicts a world ravaged by climate apocalypse, DICE added that the game was not a commentary on climate change and the team only chose this setting for "gameplay reasons".

As each match can now accommodate more players, the team had significantly expanded the size of the maps. However, instead of simply creating huge maps, the locations in the game were designed based on the idea of "clustering" in order to funnel players towards a particular direction where they can engage with other players. Daniel Berlin, the design director of the game, described the maps as "several smaller maps stitched together". The decision to include artificial intelligence for the All-out Warfare mode was made early during the game's development as the team believed that it would be a good entry point for beginners. Ripple Effect, formerly DICE Los Angeles, led the development of Battlefield Portal. The game runs on the latest iteration of the Frostbite engine.

A short work-in-progress demonstration of the game was shown at the 2020 EA Play Live event, teasing large scale battles and detailed facial animations. The game was announced on June 9, 2021. An open beta took place from October 6 to 9, 2021, ahead of the game's launch on November 19, 2021, for PlayStation 4, PlayStation 5, Windows, Xbox One, and Xbox Series X/S. The launch was delayed from its original October 22 release date due to impacts from the ongoing COVID-19 pandemic.

Post-launch content 
EA plans to support the game extensively with downloadable content after launch; Battlefield 2042 utilizes the battle pass model. Gameplay content would be free for all players, whereas players who purchased the battle pass would receive additional cosmetic items. Before the release of Season 1, DICE released several updates for the game; Update 4.1 removed the 128-player Breakthrough mode, which was deemed to be too chaotic.

Season 1: Zero Hour 
The first major content update to the game, "Season 1: Zero Hour", was released on June 9, 2022. The update introduced new weapons and vehicles, a new map named "Exposure", set in the Canadian Rockies, and a new, Polish specialist named Ewelina Lis, who is equipped with a rocket launcher that can shoot player-guided projectiles. A 12-week battle pass was also included in season 1. DICE also decided to shift development resources away from the Hazard Zone mode. While the mode will remain playable, no further content would be developed for it.

Season 2: Master of Arms 
Season 2 of the game, titled "Master of Arms", was released on August 30, 2022. The content update introduced a new map called "Stranded", set in the Panama Canal, with its centerpiece being a shipwrecked tanker, new weapons, gadget and vehicles, and a new British specialist named Charlie Crawford, who is equipped with a Mounted Vulcan stationary minigun. The update also introduce weapons that were previously exclusive to the "Portal" mode to the main "All-Out Warfare" mode under the name "Vault Weapons", with the first two being the M16A3 assault rifle and the M60E4 light machine gun, originally from Battlefield 3.

Season 3: Escalation 
Season 3, titled "Escalation", was released on November 22, 2022, which added a new map set in Sweden titled "Spearhead", with its centerpiece being two megafactories. Alongside the new map, new weapons, gadgets and vehicles, along with a new Egyptian specialist named Rasheed Zain, were introduced. After the initial rollout of the update, which also saw the game be added to the EA Play subscription service, more changes are planned to roll out during the season, including a rework to the specialist system - which marks the return of the class system of past Battlefield titles - and reworks to the "Manifest" and "Breakaway" maps. These map reworks were released as part of Update 3.1. In addition to these changes, future updates as part of Season 3 will introduce more legacy "vault" weapons from both Battlefield: Bad Company 2 and Battlefield 3, with Update 3.2 in particular introducing the aforementioned reintroduction of the class system.

Season 4: Eleventh Hour 
Season 4, titled "Eleventh Hour", was launched on February 28, 2023. This season adds a new Spanish "recon" specialist named Camila Blasco, who is the last Specialist to be added to the game, new weapons and gadgetry, the new map "Flashpoint", set in the deserts of northern South Africa, and a new vehicle. Throughout this season, more weapons from Battlefield 3 are set to return.

Future 
Alongside the announcement of Season 4, DICE confirmed Season 5, which is set to include a revised version of the map "Hourglass".

Reception

Critical response 
Battlefield 2042 received "mixed or average reviews" on all platforms, according to the review aggregator Metacritic,  making it the lowest-rated installment in the Battlefield series.

Electronic Gaming Monthly gave the game five out of five stars, writing: "Battlefield 2042 brings the sandbox back to the series in bold and controversial ways. The new Specialist system might seem like sacrilege at first, but it opens up gameplay opportunities that weren't possible in previous titles. The massive, well-designed maps offer plenty of room for experimentation and emergent stories, and the modes are a blast." Hardcore Gamer summarized its 3/5 review by saying: "Battlefield 2042 should have been a triumphant return of the franchise and developer. In some respects, Battlefield 2042 delivers on its promises thanks to fantastic gameplay, a suite of new features and improvements, and a presentation that looks as good as it plays. Unfortunately, the game falls short just as much, if not more."

Jordan Devore of Destructoid wrote, "Battlefield 2042 feels like it could become a cool game, but it's tantalizingly out of reach today. There's enough promise with the satisfying-when-it-works gunplay, large-scale chaos...It didn't have to be this way though." GamesRadar+ praised Battlefield 2042s All-Out War, the visuals, and the Portal mode, but criticized the Hazard Zone mode and the removal of classes. IGN thought similarly, concluding, "For a game claiming to be the future of Battlefield, 2042s impressive Portal options make it clear that it doesn't stack up to the past. Instead, it's those same customization tools that could come to define it in time." GameSpot felt the game had a lot of variety but that many of the glitches hampered the experience, especially on PC. Christian Vaz of PCGamesN gave the game a 7/10 and criticized it for feeling rushed, stating, "This near-future sequel has all the components it needs to become a classic entry in the multiplayer series, but it feels like 2042 is many updates away from reaching its full potential."

Phil Iwaniuk writing for The Guardian gave the game two out of five stars, feeling that 128-player matches were too chaotic and granted little accomplishment for individuals while noting criticism of the game's multiple bugs and netcode issues. VG247s Sherif Saed also criticized the game's bugs and poor technical state, adding that many of the same bugs had been present in recent Battlefield games. Chris Jarrard of Shacknews described the game's Specialist system as "befuddling" and described maps as "uninspiring" and "painful to traverse" on foot, further criticizing technical issues. Writing for Push Square, Liam Croft compared the game to a starter meal, stating that what the game offered at launch was too little for the asking price.

Audience response and changes 
Player reception was much more critical. Battlefield 2042 became one of the worst reviewed games on Steam, garnering almost 30,000 negative reviews by November 21, 2021. Players criticized extensive bugs, a lack of features previously included in older Battlefield games, and several changes to gameplay. Some also panned the inclusion of Christmas-themed skins, including a leaked Santa Claus example, as conflicting with the series' "dark and gritty" tone. Despite becoming  one of its most played games on Steam at launch, the game's player count sharply declined in the following weeks from about 105,397 concurrent peak players to an average peak of 52,000. On November 28, 2021, Kotaku journalist Zack Zwiezen noted that Battlefield 2042 had been overtaken in player numbers on Steam by Farming Simulator 22, considering it notable that "one of the biggest games of the year on one of the most popular digital stores in the world on one of the biggest gaming platforms in the world [...] isn't able to keep up with Farming Simulator 22". By 2 December, Battlefield 2042 had lost 70% of its initial players on Steam. By the end of December, the Steam concurrent player base for Battlefield 2042 decreased to about 19,000, being overtaken by 2018's Battlefield V in daily player numbers. By mid-April 2022, the game's player count had declined even further, dropping below 1,000 at certain points. Following the release of update 4.00, the Steam player count increased to an average of over 2,000 players.

In January 2022, DICE removed the popular "Rush" mode from the featured playlist in Battlefield 2042s Portal mode, resulting in more backlash from players. Meanwhile, EA global communications director Andy McNamara criticized the audience's expectations as "brutal" on Twitter, causing hostile responses from players and harassment of DICE developers. On Reddit, discourse about Battlefield 2042 became adversarial enough that moderators threatened to shut down the game's official subreddit. In response to the outcry, "Rush" was restored to the game later the same month. In February 2022, a Change.org petition advocating for all buyers of Battlefield 2042 to be refunded reached more than 200,000 signatures within a month. The author of the petition cited the game's numerous technical issues that had rendered it "unplayable", while claiming that the developers failed to keep promises with improving the game at launch.

In response to fan feedback, DICE released an update for the game in April 2022, version 4.00, which brought over 400 changes, including bug fixes, improvements to gameplay balancing, and other additions. In May, DICE announced Battlefield 2042s Season 1 and released a video explaining their commitment to improving the game through changes to maps, modes, and Specialists, new items, a focus on smaller player-counts, and improving the controls and animations of player characters; DICE also announced they would no longer be supporting the game's Hazard Zone mode. In June, EA denied reports from Giant Bomb's Jeff Grubb that the development team was "down to a skeleton crew", saying, "There is a significant team across studios focused on evolving and improving the Battlefield 2042 experience for our players, and at the heart of that is our team at DICE." In September, Vince Zampella, head of Respawn Entertainment and the Battlefield series, stated that the game had "strayed a little too far from what Battlefield is".

Sales
Battlefield 2042 was the third best-selling retail game in the United Kingdom on its week of release, only behind Pokémon Brilliant Diamond and Shining Pearl. It was the second best-selling game in November 2021 in the US, according to NPD Group. It went on to become the fifth best-selling game in 2021 in the US. During an earnings call in February 2022, EA revealed that the game had missed sales expectations. EA blamed the game's performance on remote work during the COVID-19 pandemic, leading to unexpected technical issues during the launch period of the game, and remarked that some of the design choices made by the team "did not resonate" with the Battlefield community.

Controversy 
The game generated some controversy when the name of a cosmetic for a playable character alluded to the Little Green Men from the Russo-Ukrainian War. DICE stated that the reference had not been intentional and that the cosmetic would be renamed in a future update, saying the reference "isn't reflective of our team's values".

Accolades

References 
Notes

References

External links 

2021 video games
Fiction about aerial warfare
 06
Climate change in fiction
Drones in fiction
Electronic Arts games
First-person shooters
Frostbite (game engine) games
Interquel video games
Science fiction shooter video games
Multiplayer video games
PlayStation 4 games
PlayStation 5 games
Video games developed in Sweden
Video games postponed due to the COVID-19 pandemic
Video games set in Antarctica
Video games set in Belgium
Video games set in Chile
Video games set in Egypt
Video games set in India
Video games set in Iran
Video games set in Qatar
Video games set in Singapore
Video games set in South Korea
Video games set in Turkmenistan
Video games set in Canada
Video games set in Panama
Video games set in Sweden
Video games set in South Africa
Video games set in the 2040s
Video games set in the future
Dystopian video games
War video games
Windows games
Xbox One games
Xbox Series X and Series S games
Climate change mass media